Market Place Shopping Center is an enclosed shopping mall located in Champaign, Illinois, US. The mall's anchor stores are Dick's Sporting Goods, Field & Stream, JCPenney, Macy's, and Costco Wholesale. It is the second largest enclosed shopping mall in Central Illinois.

History
The mall opened in 1975 and was originally anchored by Sears, JCPenney, and Bergner's.

The shopping center acquired a Tuscany-themed Italian villa setting as part of a renovation and expansion project, completed in August 1999.

In May 2004, JCPenney, which had left the property and the region five years earlier, re-entered the mall as an anchor. In 2006, Famous-Barr rebranded as Macy's following Macy's takeover of May Department Stores, Famous-Barr's parent company.

In 2013, it was announced that Sears would be closing in 2014. Sears had operated in Champaign continuously since 1928, and had been an original anchor at the mall's 1975 opening. The store was demolished. Dick's Sporting Goods and Field & Stream built on that space in October 2015. On January 12, 2018 it was announced that Loft would be closing its store at the mall on January 27. On January 24, 2018 it was announced that H&M would move into the mall. The store will move into the Dick's Sporting Goods wing. The store will move into the Gymboree store, the former Banana Republic store, a temporary Christmas store and the Forever 21 store. Gymboree closed at the end of January. Forever 21 will temporarily move into the JCPenney wing before returning to a new permanent store in the Dick's Sporting Goods wing. It will move into the Payless ShoeSource space, the former European Famous Brands store and the Day Spa. Payless ShoeSource is moving into the vacant Loft store. Day Spa is moving into the MasterCuts space which closed on January 26.

Bergner's closed in August 2018 as part of the closure of the entire Bon-Ton department store network. In April 2019, it was announced that Costco Wholesale would replace the former Bergner's space by constructing a new store in place of the existing structure. Costco opened at the mall in October 2020. Old Navy and LensCrafters have moved to other parts of the mall in order to cut the mall's square footage by 14,000 sq. ft. for the construction of the Costco.

On January 10, 2023, it was announced that Bed Bath & Beyond would be closing as part of a plan to close 62 stores nationwide.

References

Brookfield Properties
Shopping malls in Illinois
Buildings and structures in Champaign, Illinois
Tourist attractions in Champaign County, Illinois
Shopping malls established in 1976